B.D.M. Institute, Bhiwani is a secondary school located in Loharu, Bhiwani district, Haryana, India.

External links

Schools in Haryana
Bhiwani district
2011 establishments in Haryana
Educational institutions established in 2011